Dariusz Koseła (born 12 February 1970 in Zabrze) is a retired Polish football player.

Career

National team
Koseła was a participant at the 1992 Summer Olympics, where Poland won the silver medal.

External links
 

1970 births
Living people
Polish footballers
Olympic footballers of Poland
Olympic silver medalists for Poland
Expatriate footballers in Germany
Polish expatriate footballers
Górnik Zabrze players
Ruch Radzionków players
Footballers at the 1992 Summer Olympics
Ekstraklasa players
Sportspeople from Zabrze
Medalists at the 1992 Summer Olympics
Association football midfielders